Kandreho is a district of Betsiboka in Madagascar.
It is situated at 144 km from Maevatanana.

Communes
The district is further divided into seven municipalities:

 Ambaliha
 Andasibe
 Antanimbaribe
 Behazomaty
 Betaimboay
 Kandreho
 Mahatsinjo, Maevatanana

Rivers
Mahavavy Sud River, Kandreho River, Mahakamba, Namakia, Bekoratsaka River and the Menavava river.

See also
 Kandreho Formation
 Kasijy Reserve

References 

Districts of Betsiboka